Nick Knatterton's Adventure (German: Nick Knattertons Abenteuer - Der Raub der Gloria Nylon) is a 1959 West German comedy crime film directed by Hans Quest and starring Karl Lieffen, Susanne Cramer and Maria Sebaldt. It is based on a comic strip portraying the private detective Nick Knatterton.

The film's sets were designed by the art director Walter Haag. Location shooting took place around Kassel in Hesse.

Synopsis
When Gloria Nylon, the daughter of a famous fabric manufacturing tycoon, is kidnapped the press demand that the celebrated detective Nick Knatterton is called in for the case.

Cast
 Karl Lieffen as Nick Knatterton
 Susanne Cramer as Gloria Nylon
 Maria Sebaldt as Virginia Peng
 Gert Fröbe as Hugo
 Günter Pfitzmann as Max
 Hans von Borsody as Eddie
 Stanislav Ledinek as Gustav
 Wolfgang Wahl as Tresor-Otto
 Gert Wiedenhofen as Bobby Schnieke
 Martin Hirthe as Lucius Xaver Nylon
 Herta Konrad as Trudchen Taste
 Werner Fuetterer as Redakteur
 Wolfgang Müller as Graf Rieselkalk
 Wolfgang Neuss as Diener bei Graf Rieselkalk

References

Bibliography 
 Bock, Hans-Michael & Bergfelder, Tim. The Concise CineGraph. Encyclopedia of German Cinema. Berghahn Books, 2009.

External links 
 

West German films
1959 films
1950s German-language films
German crime comedy films
1959 crime films
1950s crime comedy films
1959 comedy films
Films directed by Hans Quest
Films based on German comics
Live-action films based on comics
1950s German films